Thymelicus hyrax, the Levantine skipper, is a butterfly in family Hesperiidae. The species is distributed in Iran, Syria, Israel, Jordan, Armenia, Azerbaijan (Nakhichevan), Northwest Caucasus (Russia), Turkey, Greece, Lesbos, Chios, Samos, Rhodes

Life cycle
The species predominantly inhabits dry areas, in some regions also open woodlands, occupying the elevation range up to 2000 m above sea level. The larval host plant is most probably Achnatherum bromoides. Butterflies are on wing from June till August in a single generation.

References

External links
 Species list at Butterfly Conservation Armenia

Thymelicus
Butterflies described in 1864
Butterflies of Asia
Butterflies of Europe
Taxa named by Julius Lederer